Spring Creek is a  long first-order tributary to Brush Creek in Holt County, Nebraska.

Watershed

See also

List of rivers of Nebraska

References

Rivers of Holt County, Nebraska
Rivers of Nebraska